Shah Syed Mohammed Asrarullah Hussaini Al Maroof Syed Mohammed Imam Ali Shah Naqshbandi, Quadri, Chisthi, Hanafi  Al Baghdadi, popularly known as Imam Ali Shah  (1856 - 1920) was a  sufi saint of his time, who migrated from Damascus, Syria to Berar Province now in Maharashtra, India, and then to Hyderabad Deccan at the age of 18.

He was a descendant of the Islamic prophet Mohammed.

He laid the foundation and constructed Masjid-e-Baghdadi also known as Tek-ki-Masjid which stands still in Nampally, Hyderabad, Andhra Pradesh, India.

His dargah or shrine is attached to the same Masjid.

The annual Urs takes place on 4th Jumada al-thani every year of the Islamic calendar.

It is an Andhra Pradesh State Wakf Board Registered Dargah.

A saint from his time is Imam Ahmed Raza Khan of Bareilly, India.

2018 Urs E Shareef

See also
List of Sufis
List of Islamic studies scholars
Hyderabad State
Hadith
Sufism

References

Scholars from Hyderabad, India
Indian Muslim scholars of Islam
Indian people of Arab descent
Indian Sufis
Indian religious writers
Sunni imams
Hanafis
19th-century Muslim scholars of Islam
1856 births
1920 deaths
Barelvis
19th-century Indian writers
19th-century Indian scholars